Roman Tylkowski was a Polish chess master.

He was a well-known player in Poznań, Poland, in the 1930s and 1940s. He represented the city in 1934 and 1948 in the Polish Chess Team Championships.

Legacy 

Tylkowski is probably best known for participation in the game  against Antoni Wojciechowski at Poznań 1931 in which Wojciechowski played his famous combination.
While the game is documented on many websites and is included in a well-known chess book (see references), there is some dispute regarding the moves in this game and whether it even occurred.

References

Polish chess players
Year of birth missing
Year of death missing
Place of birth missing
20th-century chess players